Candace Elaine is a Canadian actress who has become a naturalized American citizen. Elaine is an accomplished dancer, fashionista, and stage and film actor. She most recently appeared opposite Stone Cold Steve Austin, Michael Shanks, and Michael Jai White in the action feature Tactical Force, playing the role of Ilya Kalashnikova.

Elaine worked with Tom Sizemore on Corrado, and appeared in Season 3 of Celebrity Rehab and Sober House in support of him.

Filmography
 The Ensnaring (Short Film, 2006)
 Hard Sand (TV Pilot, 2006)
 Credere, Obbedire, Combattere! (Documentary Feature, 2007)
 Corrado, feature film
 Tactical Force (2011), feature film
 Kids vs Monsters (2015), feature film

External links
 

Canadian emigrants to the United States
Living people
Canadian film actresses
Year of birth missing (living people)
Naturalized citizens of the United States